Pusheta Township is one of the fourteen townships of Auglaize County, Ohio, United States. The 2010 census found 1,301 people in the township.

Geography
Located in the southern part of the county, it borders the following townships:
Duchouquet Township - north
Union Township - northeast corner
Clay Township - east
Jackson Township, Shelby County - southeast corner
Dinsmore Township, Shelby County - south
Van Buren Township, Shelby County - southwest corner
Washington Township - west
Moulton Township - northwest corner

A small portion of Wapakoneta, the largest city and county seat of Auglaize County, is located in northwestern Pusheta Township, and the unincorporated community of Fryburg lies in the township's center.

Name and history
It is the only Pusheta Township statewide.

Formed in 1836, Pusheta Township was originally part of Allen County. The township takes its name from Pusheta Creek.

Public services
The township is split between the Wapakoneta City School District in the north and east, Botkins Local Schools in the south, and New Knoxville Local Schools in the west.

The northern section of the township is served by the Wapakoneta (45895) post office, the western section by the New Knoxville (45871) post office, and the extreme southern section by the Botkins (45306) post office.

Major highways include Interstate 75, which crosses the county from north to south, and U.S. Route 33, which sits on the township's northern border.

Government

The township is governed by a three-member board of trustees, who are elected in November of odd-numbered years to a four-year term beginning on the following January 1. Two are elected in the year after the presidential election and one is elected in the year before it. There is also an elected township fiscal officer, who serves a four-year term beginning on April 1 of the year after the election, which is held in November of the year before the presidential election. Vacancies in the fiscal officership or on the board of trustees are filled by the remaining trustees.

References

External links
Auglaize County website

Townships in Auglaize County, Ohio
1836 establishments in Ohio
Populated places established in 1836
Townships in Ohio